This article refers to the Newcastle and Darlington Junction station. For the Stockton and Darlington station see Heighington railway station

Aycliffe railway station served the village of Aycliffe in County Durham, England. The railway station was served by trains on the main line between Darlington and Durham.

History
Opened by the Newcastle and Darlington Junction Railway, and then the North Eastern Railway, it became part of the London and North Eastern Railway during the Grouping of 1923, passing on to the Eastern Region of British Railways during the nationalisation of 1948. It was then closed by  British Railways.

The site today
Trains still pass at speed on the now electrified East Coast Main Line.

References

 
 
 
 Station on navigable O.S. map

Former North Eastern Railway (UK) stations
Disused railway stations in County Durham
Railway stations in Great Britain opened in 1844
Railway stations in Great Britain closed in 1953
1844 establishments in England
1953 disestablishments in England
Newton Aycliffe